"Stricken" is a song by the American heavy metal band Disturbed. The song was released on July 25, 2005, as the second single from their third studio album Ten Thousand Fists. "Stricken" was certified gold in the United States by the Recording Industry Association of America on August 18, 2008, for selling 500,000 copies. It is one of the first of Disturbed's songs to include a guitar solo. The song is featured in Guitar Hero III and Guitar Hero Live in addition to the Disturbed track pack in Guitar Hero 5. The song is also a part of the Rock Band downloadable content catalog. The song was also featured in the Project Gotham Racing 4. The musical video for the song was filmed in an abandoned hospital in which some scenes from the 1984 horror film A Nightmare on Elm Street were filmed. "Stricken" was used as official theme for WWE's PPV New Year's Revolution, in 2006.

Music video
The video for "Stricken" takes place in an abandoned asylum. There are two women in the video. A man has an affair with both of them. As a result, the man's original girlfriend is shown upset and screaming. The other woman is shown going after the man. The man, on the other hand, does not show emotion to the very end, with hands on his face. All the while, Disturbed is shown playing, in the background, and random objects are either dropped or thrown.

Track listing

CD 1
"Stricken" – 4:07
"Hell" – 4:14
"Darkness"  – 4:02

CD 2
"Stricken" – 4:07
"Dehumanized" – 3:31

7" vinyl
"Stricken" – 4:07
"Dehumanized" – 3:31

German promo
"Stricken" – 4:06

US promo
"Stricken"  – 4:05

The first B-side, "Hell", is also a bonus track on Ten Thousand Fists. The second B-side, "Dehumanized", was recorded during the recording of Believe. Both songs are also included on the B-side compilation, The Lost Children.

Chart positions

Certifications

Personnel
 David Draiman – vocals
 Dan Donegan – guitars, electronics
 John Moyer – bass
 Mike Wengren – drums

Covers
"Stricken" is covered in a more melodic, softer style by David Draiman's brother, Ben Draiman in Ben's EP entitled, The Past Is Not Far Behind.

References

2005 singles
2005 songs
Disturbed (band) songs
Reprise Records singles
Songs written by Dan Donegan
Songs written by David Draiman
Songs written by Mike Wengren
Song recordings produced by Johnny K